Sean Hall (born August 20, 1967 in Williamsburg, Virginia) is an American rower.

References 
 
 

1967 births
Living people
Sportspeople from Williamsburg, Virginia
Olympic rowers of the United States
Rowers at the 1992 Summer Olympics
Rowers at the 1996 Summer Olympics
Rowers at the 2000 Summer Olympics
World Rowing Championships medalists for the United States
American male rowers
Pan American Games medalists in rowing
Pan American Games gold medalists for the United States
Rowers at the 1995 Pan American Games